{{Automatic taxobox 
| name = 
| image =   Parailia occidentalis.jpg
| image_caption =  Parailia occidentalis 
| taxon = Parailia
| authority = Boulenger, 1899
| type_species = Paralillia congica
| type_species_authority = Boulenger, 1899
}}Parailia' is a genus of schilbid catfishes native to Africa.

Species
There are currently five recognized species in this genus:
 Parailia congica Boulenger, 1899
 Parailia occidentalis (Pellegrin, 1901)
 Parailia pellucida (Boulenger, 1901) (Glass schilbid)
 Parailia somalensis (Vinciguerra, 1897) (Somalia glass catfish)
 Parailia spiniserrata'' Svensson, 1933

References

Schilbeidae

Freshwater fish genera
Catfish genera
Taxa named by George Albert Boulenger